Adham is an Arabic  masculine given name meaning "intensity in the blackness," used to describe shiny black stallions. It is also used as a surname. People with the name include:

Given name
 Adham Ahmedbaev (born 1966), Uzbek politician
 Adham Al-Akrad (1974–2020), Syrian rebel leader
 Adham Al-Sqour (born 1994), Jordanian gymnast
 Adham Baba (born 1962), Malaysian politician
 Adham Barzani (born 1962), Iraqi politician
 Adham El Idrissi (born 1997), Dutch footballer
 Adham El Zabedieh, Lebanese rugby league footballer
 Adham Hatem Elgamal (born 1998), Egyptian badminton player
 Adham Faramawy, British artist
 Adham Fawzy (born 2000), Egyptian chess player 
 Adham Hadiya (born 1985), Israeli footballer 
 Adham Hassoun, detainee in United States custody
 Adham Hemdan (born 1959), Kuwaiti swimmer
 Adham Khalid (born 2002), Egyptian footballer
 Adham Khan (1531–1562), general of Akbar
 Adham Khanjar, Lebanese Shiite rebel
 Adham Makhadmeh (born 1986), Jordanian football referee
 Adham Medhat (born 1975), Egyptian sport shooter
 Adham Nabulsi (born 1993), Jordanian-Palestinian artist, vocalist, producer, composer, and songwriter
 Adham Ahmed Saleh (born 1993), Egyptian wrestler
 Adham Shaikh, Canadian composer
 Adham Sharara (born 1953), Canadian sports official
 Adham Wanly (1908-1959), Egyptian painter

Surname
 Abbas Adham (1885–1969), Iranian physician and politician
 Adel Adham (1928–1996), Egyptian actor
 Allen Adham, American businessman
 Ibrahim ibn Adham, Arab Muslim saint and Sufi mystic
 Ismail Adham (1911–1940), Egyptian writer 
 Kamal Adham (1929–1999), Turkish-born Saudi intelligence chief and businessman
 Mohamed Ashour El-Adham (born 1985), Egyptian footballer

Fictional characters
 Adham Sabri, the main character in Ragol Al Mostaheel series by Nabil Farouk

Other uses
 Adham Khan's Tomb, Indian monument
 Sultan Ibrahim Ibn Adham Mosque, the largest mosque in the Palestinian town of Beit Hanina
 In Turkish spelling, this name is written as Edhem or more frequently as Ethem.

Arabic-language surnames
Arabic masculine given names